Purpureocillium is a fungal genus in the Ophiocordycipitaceae family. The genus now contains at least 5 species with the type species Purpureocillium lilacinum, a common saprobic, filamentous fungus. It has been isolated from a wide range of habitats, including cultivated and uncultivated soils, forests, grassland, deserts, estuarine sediments and sewage sludge, and insects. It has also been found in nematode eggs, and occasionally from females of root-knot and cyst nematodes. In addition, it has frequently been detected in the rhizosphere of many crops. It also has a wide pH tolerance and can grow on a variety of substrates. P. lilacinum has shown promising results for use as a biocontrol agent to control the growth of destructive root-knot nematodes.

Species and phylogeny

Species fungorum and GBIF currently list:
 Purpureocillium atypicola (Yasuda) Spatafora, Hywel-Jones & Luangsa-ard, 2015
 Purpureocillium lavendulum Perdomo, Dania García, Gené, Cano & Guarro, 2013
 Purpureocillium lilacinum (Thom) Luangsa-ard, Houbraken, Hywel-Jones & Samson, 2011
 Purpureocillium sodanum Papizadeh, Soudi, Wijayaw., Shahz.Faz. & K.D.Hyde, 2016
 Purpureocillium takamizusanense (Kobayasi) S.Ban, Azuma & Hirok.Sato, 2015
 a number of unclassified isolates.

P. lilacinum was previously considered to be monotypic and was classified with the Fungi Imperfecti or Deuteromycetes, fungi for which perfect (i.e., sexually reproducing) states have rarely been found. "Paecilomyces lilacinus" was classified in the section Isarioidea, for which perfect states had not been found. Many isolates of P. lilacinum have been identified from around the world and it is accepted that variation exists within the species. Phylogenetic analysis of P. lilacinum isolates show that it is not related to Trichoderma, Gliocladium and Hypocrea and more related to entomopathogenic genera such as Hirsutella and Ophiocordyceps in the Hypocreales.

References

Carnivorous fungi
Fungi of Asia
Fungi of Europe
Fungi of North America
Fungi of South America
Ophiocordycipitaceae